Jassim Mohammad Abdulaziz, was a journalist and media personality in Qatar and the Gulf countries.

Early life and education
Jassim Abdulaziz was born on 13 September 1963 in Qatar, one of the oldest districts and neighborhoods in Doha, Al Jasrah (الجسرة).
Abdulaziz studied engineering at Qatar University, Doha.

Jassim Abdulaziz had a real passion towards Television programming, as it was one of his main ambitions since he was young. In personal sphere, he was a caring son and loving brother. He devoted the best part of his life to taking care of his bedridden father and upbringing of his siblings after his father's death. And those reasons were a result of not being Jassim married.

Career 
Abdulaziz commenced his career as a news presenter in 1983. In addition to news, also hosted cultural and sports programs. Emrah wa Erbah - امرح واربحwas one of the popular game shows he hosted. He also presented programs related to national and religious celebratory events. Another popular show he presented, Night of Eid' - ليلة العيد where he would invite Qatari, Gulf, and Arab media, artists and sports personalities to celebrating special occasion. He died on 1 December 2020 after a short illness.

Posthumous honors

Abdulrahman bin Hamad Al Thani, CEO of Qatar Media Corporation, inaugurated new television studios bearing the name of Jassem Abdulaziz in honor of his media career.

Notes

1963 births
2000 deaths
Qatari journalists
Qatari television presenters
Qatar University alumni